Eumaragma is a genus of moths of the family Crambidae. It contains only one species, Eumaragma orthiopis, which is found in Fiji.

References

Pyraustinae
Taxa named by Edward Meyrick
Monotypic moth genera
Moths of Fiji
Crambidae genera